John T. Ward Jr. (August 2, 1945 – April 24, 2021) was an American racehorse trainer.  He was a graduate of the University of Kentucky with a degree in agricultural economics, where he was a member of Delta Tau Delta fraternity.  He was a third-generation horseman on both sides of his family.  He took charge of the family farm at age twenty-five when his father became ill in 1970.

Ward met his wife, Donna, when she was showing horses. They operated John T. Ward Stables and Sugar Grove Farm in Central Kentucky.

References

External links
NYRA Biography

1945 births
2021 deaths
University of Kentucky alumni
American horse trainers
Horse trainers from Lexington, Kentucky